All of This Love is the fifth studio album by American country music artist Pam Tillis, released on November 7, 1995 via Arista Records. The album reached #25 on the Billboard country albums charts. Singles from the album were "Deep Down" at a #6 peak on the Hot Country Singles chart, "The River and the Highway" at #8, "It's Lonely Out There" at #14, and "Betty's Got a Bass Boat" at #62, her first single since the late 1980s to miss Top 40 entirely. Bruce Hornsby's "Mandolin Rain" is covered on this album as well. The album has been certified Gold for shipments of over 500,000 units in the U.S.

Critical reception
Billboard published a positive review which stated that Tillis "continues to mature as a singer".

Track listing

Charts

Weekly charts

Year-end charts

References

1995 albums
Arista Records albums
Pam Tillis albums